Teresa Stadlober (born February 1, 1993) is an Austrian cross-country skier. She first competed at the Winter Olympics in 2014 Winter Olympics in Sochi, in skiathlon and women's classical. She won individual Olympic medal at the 2022 Winter Olympics, in the 15 km skiathlon event.

She is the daughter of former cross-country skier Alois Stadlober and former alpine skier Roswitha Steiner, and younger sister of cross-country skier Luis Stadlober.

Cross-country skiing results
All results are sourced from the International Ski Federation (FIS).

Olympic Games

World Championships

World Cup

Season standings

Individual podiums
 3 podiums – (1 , 2 )

References

External links
 
 
 

1993 births
Living people
Austrian female cross-country skiers
Cross-country skiers at the 2014 Winter Olympics
Cross-country skiers at the 2018 Winter Olympics
Cross-country skiers at the 2022 Winter Olympics
Medalists at the 2022 Winter Olympics
Olympic bronze medalists for Austria
Olympic cross-country skiers of Austria
Tour de Ski skiers
People from Radstadt
Sportspeople from Salzburg (state)